Van Ewijcksluis is a hamlet in the Dutch province of North Holland.

Van Ewijcksluis is considered a part of Anna Paulowna. It is named after Daniël Jacob van Ewijck, the King's commissioner of North Holland.

References

Populated places in North Holland
Hollands Kroon